Chengalpattu (Tamil: செங்கல்பட்டு), is a city and the headquarters of Chengalpattu district .

Chengalpattu may also refer to:
 Chengalpattu district, is a district.
 Chengalpattu taluk, is a taluk.
 Chengalpattu (state assembly constituency), is a state assembly constituency.
 Chengalpattu (Lok Sabha constituency), is a Lok Sabha constituency.
 Chengalpattu Medical College,  is an educational institution.
 Chengalpattu Junction railway station, is a railway junction.